Canadian Zephyr was a Canadian country music group. Twenty of their singles made the RPM Country Tracks charts, including the number one singles "You Made My Day Tonight" and "Guess I Went Crazy." They released two albums for United Artists and three albums for RCA.

Discography

Albums

Singles

References

Canadian country music groups